Rhynchogyna is a genus of flowering plants from the orchid family, Orchidaceae. It has three known species, all native to Indochina.

Rhynchogyna fallax (Guillaumin) Seidenf. - Vietnam
Rhynchogyna luisifolia (Ridl.) Seidenf. & Garay - Thailand, Peninsular Malaysia
Rhynchogyna saccata Seidenf. & Garay - Thailand

See also
 List of Orchidaceae genera

References

External links

Vandeae genera
Aeridinae
Orchids of Asia